Guy Gomberg (born 24 September 1990) is an Israeli footballer currently plying his trade at Hapoel Gedera.

References

External links
 

1990 births
Living people
Jewish Israeli sportspeople
Israeli footballers
Maccabi Netanya F.C. players
Hapoel Herzliya F.C. players
Maccabi Kiryat Malakhi F.C. players
Sektzia Ness Ziona F.C. players
Hapoel Rishon LeZion F.C. players
Hapoel Tel Aviv F.C. players
Beitar Tel Aviv Bat Yam F.C. players
Maccabi Herzliya F.C. players
Hapoel Marmorek F.C. players
Hapoel Bnei Lod F.C. players
Hapoel Ashkelon F.C. players
F.C. Kafr Qasim players
Maccabi Sha'arayim F.C. players
Maccabi Ironi Ashdod F.C. players
Footballers from Netanya
Israeli Premier League players
Liga Leumit players
Association football fullbacks